Beulah is a ghost town in Angelina County, in the U.S. state of Texas. It is located within the Lufkin, Texas micropolitan area.

History
Beulah had a church, a store, and several houses in the 1930s. Many of the community's residents worked in a nearby oilfield named Ginter. The population declined sometime after World War II, and only two churches and a few scattered houses remained in the area in the early 1990s.

Geography

Education
Beulah is located within the Diboll Independent School District.

See also
List of ghost towns in Texas

References

Geography of Angelina County, Texas
Ghost towns in East Texas